Improvaganza may refer to:

 An annual international improvisation festival by Rapid Fire Theatre
 Drew Carey's Improv-A-Ganza, an improvisational comedy television program